Pazinotus brevisplendoris is a species of sea snail, a marine gastropod mollusk in the family Muricidae, the murex snails or rock snails.

Description

Distribution
This marine species occurs off Réunion.

References

External links
  Houart, R.; Héros, V. (2012). New species of Muricidae (Gastropoda) and additional or noteworthy records from the western Pacific. Zoosystema. 34(1), 21-37

Muricidae
Gastropods described in 1985